A-Musik is a record label for experimental music, a record distributor and a music store. A-Musik is based in Cologne and was founded in 1995.

Artists on A-Musik

DAT Politics
Felix Kubin
Microstoria
Wolfgang Müller
Marcus Schmickler
Lukas Simonis (Coolhaven)
Wabi-Sabi

See also
 List of record labels

External links
 Official site

Record labels established in 1995
German independent record labels
Alternative rock record labels
Electronic music record labels
Experimental music record labels
Culture in Cologne